Jahi Lateef Word-Daniels (born November 19, 1986) is a former American football cornerback who is currently a free agent. He was signed by the San Francisco 49ers as an undrafted free agent in 2009. He played college football at Georgia Tech.

Word-Daniels was also a member of the Detroit Lions and Virginia Destroyers.

External links
Georgia Tech Yellow Jackets bio

1986 births
Living people
People from Laurel, Mississippi
People from Hoover, Alabama
Players of American football from Mississippi
Players of American football from Alabama
American football cornerbacks
American football safeties
Georgia Tech Yellow Jackets football players
San Francisco 49ers players
Detroit Lions players
Virginia Destroyers players